"Show Me the Way to Go Home" is a popular song written in 1925 by the English songwriting team Jimmy Campbell and Reg Connelly, using the pseudonym "Irving King".  The song is said to have been written on a train journey from London by Campbell and Connelly. They were tired from the traveling and had a few alcoholic drinks during the journey, hence the lyrics. The song is in common use in England, Ireland, Scotland, Wales and North America.

Publication
The music and lyrics were written in 1925 by Jimmy Campbell and Reg Connelly.  They self-published the sheet music and it became their first big success, selling 2 million copies and providing the financial basis of their publishing firm, Campbell, Connelly & Co.  Campbell and Connelly published the sheet music and recorded the song under the pseudonym "Irving King".

The song was recorded by several artists in the 1920s.  The first recordings, in 1925, were by Hal Swain's New Princes' Toronto Band – a group of Canadian musicians working in London – and by American-born male impersonator Ella Shields, in both cases for the Columbia label in London. Other recordings were made by radio personalities The Happiness Boys, Vincent Lopez and his Orchestra, and the California Ramblers.  Throughout the twentieth into the twenty-first century it has been recorded by numerous artists.

Lyrics 
Show me the way to go home,  
I'm tired and I want to go to bed,  
I had a little drink about an hour ago,  
And it's gone right to my head,  
Wherever I may roam,  
On land or sea or foam,   
You will always hear me singing this song,  
Show me the way to go home.

Parodies
Parodies popular on Midwest American campuses in the 1950s went:

Indicate the way to my abode 
I'm fatigued and I want to retire 
I imbibed a few about sixty minutes ago 
And it percolated right through my cerebellum 
Wherever I may perambulate 
O'er land or sea or atmospheric vapor 
You will always hear me rendering this melody 
Indicate the way to my abode

or 

Indicate the way to my abode 
I'm fatigued and I wish to retire 
I had a spot of beverage sixty minutes ago 
And its risen right up to my cranium 
No matter wherever I may perambulate  
On land or sea or atmospheric vapour 
You can always hear me chanting the melody 
Indicate the way to my abode

Some similar versions substitute "terra firma" for land and/or "aqueous precipitate" for foam.

Literature 
George Orwell references the song in his 1934 novel Burmese Days.
Norman Mailer's 1948 novel The Naked and the Dead references the song several times.
Brick, a main character of the Tennessee Williams 1955 play Cat on a Hot Tin Roof, sings this song toward the end while drinking liquor, leaving out the line "And it's gone right to my head" and the last two lines due to dialogue between other characters.
In Truman Capote's 1956 short story "A Christmas Memory", Miss Sook sings a line from the song.
Albert Wendt references the song, slightly and purposefully revising it in his first novel, Sons For the Return Home (1973).
In Terry Pratchett's 1995 novel Maskerade, the witches hear this song being sung by a neighbour taking an evening bath, and are surprised when he switches from English to Italian when he thinks he is being overheard. When he believes the coast is clear, he switches back to English.

Film 
 The first two lines of the song are shown on screen in King Vidor's silent film, The Crowd (1928) after a scene where John goes to borrow some liquor from Bert but decides to stay and drink and dance with Bert and the two women at Bert's house instead of going home to spend Christmas Eve with his wife and her family.
 This song was the basis for a 1932 Screen Songs animated short by Fleischer Studios.
 In the movie Hell Below (1933), it is sung by Lt. JG "Brick" Walters, played by Robert Young.
 On a street scene in Beauty for Sale (1933), a strolling trio of youths sing it.
 Sung by the cast in  Husbands (1970)
 In Jaws (1975), it is sung by Brody (Roy Scheider), Quint (Robert Shaw), and Hooper (Richard Dreyfuss) at night on board the Orca.
 Oliver Statham sings it as he completes a record-breaking cave dive in The Underground Eiger (1979), a British documentary.
 In a stolen car scene from Eat My Dust! (1976) starring Ron Howard.
 It is sung by an old man in the jail in A River Runs Through It (1992) when Paul is picked up by his brother.
 In the Woody Allen film Cassandra's Dream (2007), Terry (Colin Farrell) and Ian (Ewan McGregor) sing this song on the maiden voyage of their boat.
 In the opening scene of Piranha 3D (2010), Richard Dreyfuss (reprising/spoofing his character of Matt Hooper from Jaws) listens to this song as well as singing along.
In The Battery (2012), Ben (Jeremy Gardner) and Mickey  (Adam Cronheim) drunkenly sing the lyrics of the song while trapped in a car.
Towards the end of This Beautiful Fantastic (2015), Milly (Eileen Davies) sings a few lines from this song when she is accompanied home by Bella (Jessica Brown Findlay).

Television 
In the 1994 episode "Show Me The Way To Go Home" from the TV show Chespirito, the characters sing and dance to this song.
In the premiere episode of the World War II TV show Combat!, "Forgotten Front", Albert Paulsen plays a captured German soldier who shows his love for American music by singing this song.
In an episode of Family Guy ("Mind Over Murder"), Stewie is intoxicated and singing this song. 
The character Harry Hewitt sings a portion of this song in a drunken stupor in an early episode of Coronation Street, broadcast in early 1961.
Davy Jones sings this during the "Listen To The Band/Chaos" segment of The Monkees TV special 33⅓ Revolutions per Monkee (NBC, 1968).
In a 1970s Sesame Street sketch, a Muppet cow sings the song's opening line repeatedly as she looks for the right kind of home for herself.
In an episode of Red Dwarf ("Thanks for the Memory"), the main characters get drunk after finding a planet with a breathable atmosphere, afterwards singing the song while piloting a shuttle back to the ship, altering the words "And it's gone right to my head" with "To celebrate Rimmer's death" (BBC2, 1988).
In the Babylon 5 episode "Meditations on the Abyss", Garibaldi is singing this to himself while he is very drunk.
In the English dub version of Ghost Stories, one of the main characters uses this song as a chant to trap a ghost.
In a season 3 episode of Lost ("Stranger in a Strange Land"), Sawyer sings this while paddling a boat with Kate back to the main island.
In the final episode of The Heavy Water War, Julie sings this song at a farewell party for the Norwegians.
In the English dub of the Pokémon episode "Showdown at the Po-ké Corral", James says "Show me the way to go home. I'm tired and I want to go to bed."
In a season 3 episode of America's Funniest Home Videos, Bob Saget remarks about a video, "Yet another version of 'Show Me the Way to Go Home'."
In the NCIS episode “Third Wheel”, the song is repeated many times by a character named Philip Brooks, played by Don Lake. At the end of the episode, Brooks finally convinced Fornell and Gibbs to join in.
In a season 2 episode of The Wilds, Seth sings the song while on the boat with Raf and Kirin, supposedly seeking rescue, while asking them if they know the movie reference.

Football
Supporters of Wimbledon FC / AFC Wimbledon have sung an adapted version reflecting their team spending 25 years away from their Plough Lane home stadium: 'Show Me The Way To Plough Lane'.

Supporters of Liverpool FC sing a version 'Show them the way to go home' to mock the away team and away fans that are visiting Anfield stadium:

Show them the way to home
They're tired and they want to go to bed (for a wank)
Cos they're only half a football team
Compared to the boys in red

Theme Parks
At Universal Studios Florida, in the Wizarding World of Harry Potter Diagon Alley, there is a window of animated shrunken heads. They banter with each other and often break into "Show Me The Way To Go Home". It is also one of the spots where one can use an interactive wand and use the Silencio wand movement to make them stop singing and make muffled sounds as if they suddenly can't move their lips. It is located across from Borgin & Burke's gift shop and next to the Dystal Phaelanges skeleton display. This along with several other design details throughout the Harry Potter themed section are a tribute to the former Jaws attraction, which closed on January 2, 2012 and was replaced by Diagon Alley in 2014.

Recordings
Frank Crumit recorded a version of the song in 1926.
Julie London recorded a version of the song for her 1968 album Easy Does It.
Jefferson Starship covered the song live during shows of their Acoustic Explorer / Acoustic Shuttlecraft incarnation in 1996–1998.
Emerson, Lake & Palmer included their version of the song on their 1977 album Works Volume II.
Shai Hulud sings the song as a group as the hidden track on their album Hearts Once Nourished with Hope and Compassion.
Bono, the lead singer of the band U2, used the song several times whilst in the guise of the stage character Macphisto in the band's Zoo TV Tour in 1992–93.
Michael McCormack and guitarist Greg Parker recorded a version of the song for the end titles of the Jaws documentary The Shark Is Still Working:The Impact & Legacy of Jaws.
Squalus covered the song on their 2017 album The Great Fish.

References

English folk songs
Songs about alcohol
Emerson, Lake & Palmer songs
Songs written by Jimmy Campbell and Reg Connelly
1925 songs